The 1992 Detroit Drive season was the fifth season for the Drive. They finished 9–1 and won ArenaBowl VI.

Regular season

Schedule

Standings

z – clinched homefield advantage

y – clinched division title

x – clinched playoff spot

Playoffs

Roster

Awards

1992 Arena Football League season
1992 in sports in Michigan
Massachusetts Marauders
ArenaBowl champion seasons